A supervillain is a type of villain character.

Supervillain may also refer to:

 SuperVillain Studios, a video game development company
 The Supervillains, an American reggae band
 "Supervillain", a song by Nicole Scherzinger
 MF DOOM, singer, often refers to himself as the "Supervillain".
"SuperVillain The Making Of Takashi 6ix9ine", a 3-part Docu-series by Showtime about American Rapper 6ix9ine